= Lankacom =

Telecommunication company in Sri Lanka

LankaCom Services
- Type: Internet Service Provider
- Industry: Telecommunications
- Founded: 1991
- Headquarters: Colombo, Sri Lanka
- Area served: Local and International
- Key people: Rohith Udalagama (Managing Director)
- Products: Internet Lease Lines, IP/VPN Connectivity
- Number of employees: 170+
- Parent: Singtel
- Website: lankacom.net

LankaCom, also known as Lanka Communications, is a Sri Lanka–based telecommunications company, founded in 1991. It is a subsidiary of Singtel and was the first company granted a Communication Operator License in the country.
